The President's Medal, also known as the Royal Academy of Engineering President's Medal, is an award given by the President of the Royal Academy of Engineering. It was first given in 1987.

History
The award is given at the RAEng's annual awards dinner.

Award winners
 2020 - Dervilla Mitchell HonCBE 
 2019 - Professor Richard Williams OBE 
 2018 - Professor Sir William Wakeham
 2017 - Ian Shott CBE 
 2016 - Dr Ian Nussey OBE 
 2015 - Sir Richard Olver
 2014 - Dr Dame Sue Ion DBE 
 2013 - Terry Hill CBE FREng
 2011 - Professor Anthony Kelly CBE
 2009 - Sir Alan Rudge CBE FREng FRS
 2007 - Rolls-Royce plc
 2006 - Sir David Davies CBE FREng FRS
 2005 - Jonathan Ive
 2004 - Jim Eyre
 2000 - HRH Prince Philip, Duke of Edinburgh
 1998 - Keith Duckworth OBE
 1995 - Sir William Stewart FRS FRSE
 1994 - Lord Phillips of Ellesmere FRS
 1993 - Sir Neil Cossons OBE
 1990 - Rhys Lloyd, Baron Lloyd of Kilgerran
 1988 - David Sainsbury, Baron Sainsbury of Turville
 1987 - Air Marshal Sir Richard Wakeford KCB LVO OBE AFC

See also

 List of engineering awards

References

External links
 RAEng

Awards of the Royal Academy of Engineering
Awards established in 1987